Spillett is a division of the Northern Territory Legislative Assembly in Australia. It was created in 2016, for the 2016 general elections, and surrounds Palmerston.  It is named for Peter Spillett, a historian and former member of Darwin City Council.

Historically, Palmerston has been a stronghold for the conservative Country Liberal Party.  However, Spillett is based on a particularly conservative portion of Palmerston.  It was created with a notional CLP majority of 17.9 percent, making it on paper the CLP's safest metropolitan seat.

Before the election Lia Finocchiaro, the then-CLP member for Drysdale, opted to transfer to Spillett after much of her old base was redistributed there. She defeated former Treasurer Dave Tollner for preselection; Tollner had contested Spillett after his old seat of Fong Lim saw most of its more conservative sections transferred to Spillett, resulting in Fong Lim becoming extremely marginal.  Finocchiaro weathered the massive Labor wave that swept through the Territory at the 2016 election—a wave that saw Labor win her old seat of Drysdale on a large swing.  In the end, Finocchiaro proved to be in the least danger of the CLP's elected members.  She was the only CLP member to win a majority of the primary vote, and went on to win with only a small two-party swing against her.  This left Spillett as the only CLP seat in the metropolitan area, and the only safe CLP seat in the legislature.  After the election, Finocchiaro was named deputy leader of what remained of the CLP, and hence Deputy Leader of the Opposition. She then became Leader of the Opposition after Gary Higgins's retirement in 2020.

Members for Spillett

Election results

References

External links
Division Profile at the Northern Territory Electoral Commission

Spillett
2016 establishments in Australia
Constituencies established in 2016